Lafayette High School was a public high school in Buffalo, New York. It was the oldest public school in Buffalo that remained in its original building, a stone, brick and terra-cotta structure in the French Renaissance Revival style by architects August Esenwein and James A. Johnson.  Although classes began off-site during construction of the school, the building was completed and graduated its first class in 1903. It was added to the National Register of Historic Places in 1980. It is located in Buffalo's Upper West Side at 370 Lafayette Avenue.

The name 'Lafayette High School' was phased out beginning in 2015, graduating its final class in 2018, and was replaced by the name Lafayette International High School and Newcomers Academy. Classes continue to be held in the historic building.

History 
Lafayette High School was the third high school built in Buffalo, New York. It has fallen into recent struggles with academics and has been placed on New York State's Watch List of Persistently Underperforming Schools. After the 2010–2011 school year, the school re-opened as a multicultural school with a new principal. The school also began housing seventh and eighth graders from nearby International School 45. This arrangement continued until 2015.

Former principals 
Previous assignment and reason for departure denoted in parentheses
Mr. Arthur Detmers–1903-1906 (unknown, named Instructor of The Hill School)
Mr. Calvert King Mellen–1906-1934 (Math teacher - Buffalo Central High School, retired)
Mr. Frank Gott–1934-1955 (Vice Principal - Lafayette High School, retired)
Mr. Abraham Axelrod–1955-1958 (Assistant Principal - Kensington High School, died)
Mr. Robert C. McGowan–1958-1968 (Assistant Principal - East High School, retired)
Mr. Gerald S. Hare–1968-1972 (Assistant Principal - East High School, transferred to Buffalo Public Schools District Offices)
Mr. Frederick D. Ganter–1972-1997 (Assistant Principal - East High School, retired)
Ms. Sharon A. Lanza–1997-2004 (Assistant Principal - Lafayette High School, retired)
Mrs. Jacquelyn M. Baldwin–2004-2008 (Assistant Principal - City Honors School, transferred to Office Of School Performance)
Dr. Phyllis F. Morrell–2008-2011 (Principal on Assignment - McKinley Vocational High School, named Principal of Dr. Lydia T. Wright School of Excellence)
Mrs. Naomi R. Cerre–2011-2015 (Assistant Principal - McKinley High School, returned to McKinley)
Mrs. Denise E. Clarke–2015-2017 (Principal - Riverside Institute of Technology, retired)
Mr. Michael J. Mogavero–2017-2018 (Principal - Academy School 131, named Principal of Math, Science, Technology Preparatory School @ 39)

Selected former assistant principals 
Previous assignment and reason for departure denoted in parentheses
Mr. Charles E. Rhodes–1918-1925 (English Teacher - Lafayette High School, named Principal of Bennett High School)
Mr. Frank Gott–1925-1934 (unknown, named Principal of Lafayette High School)
Mr. Irvin H. Himmele–1934-1941, 1948-1951 (Social Studies teacher - Lafayette High School, placed on military leave)
Mr. Carl S. Walz–1941-1948 (Math teacher - Lafayette High School, named Assistant Principal of East High School)
Mr. Frank J. Kelly–1951-1955 (Assistant Principal - South Park High Annex, named Assistant Principal of Kensington High School)
Dr. J. Norman Hayes–1955-1958 (Assistant Principal - School 87, named Principal of South Park High School)
Mr. Martin J. O'Donnell–1958-1962 (Acting Assistant Principal - Kensington High School, named Principal of Grover Cleveland High School)
Ms. Margaret V. Lombardi–1962-1966 (Guidance Counselor - School 72, named Principal of Woodlawn Junior High School)
Ms. Mary Elizabeth Dougherty–1966-1970 (Guidance Counselor - Lafayette High School, named Director of Business Education for Buffalo Public Schools)
Mr. Chester J. Kryszczuk–1966-1969 (Assistant Principal - School 59, named Principal of School 80)
Mr. Salvatore J. Scamacca–1969-1990 (Instrumental Music teacher - Lafayette High School, retired)
Mr. Gerald H. Hesson–1972-1974 (Social Studies teacher - South Park High School, named Principal of Fillmore Middle School)
Dr. Daniel M. Kublitz–1974-1982 (Assistant Principal - Kensington High School, retired)
Mr. Charles G. Erickson–1983-1987 (Coordinator of Student Affairs - Kensington High School, retired)
Mr. Thomas P. Kopera–1987-1990 (Business teacher - Lafayette High School, named Principal of Burgard Vocational High School)
Mr. Elzie B. Fisher–1990-1995 (Assistant Principal - Kensington High School, named Principal of Buffalo Alternative High School)
Ms. Patricia C. Kormash–1990-1994 (French teacher - Lafayette High School, named Assistant Principal of North Tonawanda High School)
Ms. Sharon Lanza–1994-1997 (Assistant Principal - Grover Cleveland High School, named Principal of Lafayette High School)
Mr. Thomas M. Kalenik–1995-2004 (Social Studies teacher - Buffalo Public Schools, retired)
Ms. Lisa K. Robinson–1997-2006 (Computer Science teacher - Hutchinson Central Technical High School, named Assistant Principal of Opportunity Center at 331)
Mr. Gregory K. Pigeon–2004-2005 (Business teacher - Riverside Institute of Technology, named Assistant Principal of Erie 1 BOCES - Harkness Center)
Mr. Philip M. Martin–2005-2006 (Assistant Principal - Hutchinson Central Technical School, named Associate Principal of Shenendehowa High School)
Mrs. Denise Clarke–2006-2009 (Acting Assistant Principal - City Honors School, named Assistant Principal Of Riverside Institute of Technology)
Mr. Gregory D. Mott–2006 (Assistant Principal - Opportunity School at 331, named Principal of Academy School 131 @ 44)
Mr. John E. Evert–2006-2008 (Business teacher - Burgard Vocational High School, named Vice Principal of Lewiston-Porter High School)
Mrs. Julie L Horn–2008-2014 (Assistant Principal - Bennett High School, named Assistant Principal of Newcomers Academy @ Lafayette)
Mr. Craig M. Brodnicki–2008-2016 (Assistant Principal - Campus West School, named Assistant Principal of McKinley Vocational High School)
Ms. Yuldonna M. Middleton–2011-2015 (Assistant Principal - International School, retired)
Mr. Rafael A. Mercado–2016-2017 (Assistant Principal - Emerson School of Hospitality, named Assistant Principal of D'Youville Porter Campus School)
Mr. Daniel J. Bass–2015-2018 (Assistant Principal - McKinley Vocational High School, named Assistant Principal of The New Buffalo School of Culinary Art & Hospitality Management)

Selected former administrators

Academics 
Lafayette High School currently serves as home to many Buffalo high school students learning English as a second language.

Bell Schedule

Notable alumni

 Gordon Bunshaft (class of 1928), noted twentieth-century architect.
 Robert J. Donovan (class of 1932), Washington Bureau Chief, New York Herald Tribune and Los Angeles Times. President, White House Correspondents' Association. Author of 12 books including PT-109. Only journalist to ever address a Joint Session of Congress.
 Liz Dribben (class of 1954), first female news anchor on Buffalo television, copy writer at CBS News for Dan Rather, Walter Cronkite, and Charles Kuralt.  Member of the Buffalo Broadcasting Hall of Fame.
 Jeremiah Goodman (class of 1939), artist, known simply as "Jeremiah", painter of interior still lifes of famous residences.
 Cecil de Blaquiere Howard (class of 1903), noted sculptor who lived in Paris, France from 1905 to 1940, and in New York until his death in 1956.
 Barney Lepper (class of 1915), founder of the Buffalo All-Stars, which eventually became the city's first NFL team
 Gary Mallaber (class of 1964), Multiple platinum selling drummer and producer involved with acts such as The Steve Miller Band, Van Morrison and Eddie Money.
 Fran Striker (class of 1922), author, creator of the radio serial The Lone Ranger.
 Bruce Shanks (class of 1927), Pulitzer Prize-winning political cartoonist.
 Winifred C. Stanley (class of 1927), attorney and first member of congress to introduce legislation prohibiting discrimination in pay on account of sex
 Frank Kelly Freas (class of 1938), famed science-fiction cover artist.
 The Modernaires (Hal Dickinson, Chuck Goldstein, and Bill Conway, late 1930s), the popular harmony group renowned for its performances on record and motion pictures with the Glenn Miller Orchestra.
 Tedd Lewin (class of 1953), artist, author and illustrator of children's books.
 Angelo Coniglio (class of 1954), first Civil Engineering graduate of the University at Buffalo, engineer, professor of engineering, genealogist, author of the historical novella The Lady of the Wheel and archivist of the American Football League.
 Edward C. Lawson (class of 1964), Edward won a landmark Supreme Court victory over racism and arbitrary stop and seizure practices by California police by defending himself before the Supreme Court of the US. [Lawson v. Kolender, 658 F.2d 1362 (9th Cir. 1981) October 15, 1981 et seq.]. Few Lafayette graduates have ever shown such personal triumph over injustice.
Charles Reidpath Olympic gold medalist
Bobby Militello jazz saxophonist

Shanks (1927) and Lewin (1953), and all the art students in between were influenced by Elizabeth Weiffenbach, who taught art at the school for over forty years. These included Jack Smart (class of 1922), an artist who also played The Fat Man on 1940s radio; and Irving Jeremiah Goodman (class of 1939), a contemporary artist specializing in room still lifes. Turner rowed for the U.S. in the 1956 Olympic Games in Melbourne, Australia, was executive editor of The Buffalo Courier-Express, and is a member of the exclusive Gridiron Club in Washington, D.C.

The public school is supported by the private Lafayette High School Alumni Association. In 1999, the association restored the building's landmark lantern or "cupola", which had deteriorated and been demolished for safety reasons in the 1970s.  In May 2003, the association sponsored and ran a 100th Anniversary Celebration, attended by over 1,700 alumni and their guests, raising $30,000 for the school. The funds will establish the Ramsi P. Tick media room in memory of entrepreneur Tick, an LHS alumnus and philanthropist.  The association also awards several annual grants and scholarships for worthy causes and students, and on Sunday, August 4, 2013 is holding a free All-Class Reunion to celebrate the school's one hundred and tenth year.

As their logos, the school and the Association use the LHS Triangle (Lafayette High School; Loyalty, Honor, Service), and the Lafayette Angel.

Gallery

References

1903 establishments in New York (state)
2018 disestablishments in New York (state)
Art Nouveau architecture in New York (state)
Art Nouveau educational buildings
Educational institutions disestablished in 2018
High schools in Buffalo, New York
National Register of Historic Places in Buffalo, New York
Public high schools in New York (state)
School buildings on the National Register of Historic Places in New York (state)